Příšovice is a municipality and village in Liberec District in the Liberec Region of the Czech Republic. It has about 1,300 inhabitants.

History
The first written mention of Příšovice is from 1318.

References

External links

Villages in Liberec District